Haven USD 312 is a public unified school district headquartered in Haven, Kansas, United States.  The district includes the communities of Darlow, Haven, Mount Hope, Partridge, Yoder, and nearby rural areas.

Schools
The school district operates the following schools:
 Haven High School
 Haven Middle School
 Haven Grade School
 Yoder Charter School

See also
 Kansas State Department of Education
 Kansas State High School Activities Association
 List of high schools in Kansas
 List of unified school districts in Kansas

References

External links
 

School districts in Kansas